HD 118203 b is a jovian planet that takes only 6.13 days or 147 hours to orbit the parent star HD 118203 at a distance of 0.07 astronomical units. The exact mass was not known since inclination was not known until TESS detected the planet. This hot Jupiter is unusual since it has relatively high eccentricity of 0.31.

The planet HD 118203 b is named Staburags. The name was selected in the NameExoWorlds campaign by Latvia, during the 100th anniversary of the IAU. Staburags is the name of a character from the Latvian poem Staburags un Liesma, and denotes a rock with symbolic meaning in literature and history.

HD 118203 b was discovered in August 2005 in Haute-Provence Observatory in France by Da Silva who used the doppler spectroscopy to look for shifts in the star's spectrum caused by the planet's gravity as the planet orbits the star.

In 2019 the transits of the planet were detected with the Transiting Exoplanet Survey Satellite. The host star is one of the brightest stars for transiting planets and HD 118203 b is therefore a good target for follow-up observations.

References

External links 
 

Exoplanets discovered in 2005
Giant planets
Ursa Major (constellation)
Exoplanets detected by radial velocity
Exoplanets with proper names
Transiting exoplanets

ru:HD 118203#Планета